Earl Black (born 1942) is a retired professor of Political Science at Rice University who specialized in studies of the politics of the Southern United States.

Earl Black earned a B.A. at the University of Texas at Austin in 1964 and a Ph.D. from Harvard University in 1968. He has studied the relationship between politics and race or ethnicity in the South.

He and his twin brother, Merle Black, who was a professor of political science at Emory University, have written several books on the politics of the South and the United States as a whole. Their last book together is Divided America: The Ferocious Power Struggle in American Politics (2008).

Works
Politics and Society in the South, Harvard University Press, paperback 1989. 
The Vital South: How Presidents are Elected, 1992 (with Merle Black)
The Rise of Southern Republicans, Harvard University Press, 2002. 
Divided America: The Ferocious Power Struggle in American Politics, 2008

References

Bio: "Earl Black", Rice Political Science Department

External links

Booknotes interview with Earl and Merle Black on The Vital South: How Presidents are Elected, May 3, 1992.

1942 births
Living people
Rice University faculty
University of Texas at Austin alumni
Harvard University alumni
American political scientists